= Wolfeboro I =

1966 painting by Frank Stella

- Artist: Frank Stella
- Year: 1966
- Type: Fluorescent alkyd and epoxy on canvas
- Dimensions: 408 cm × 253.4 cm (161 in × 99.8 in)
- Location: San Francisco Museum of Modern Art; San Francisco

Wolfeboro I is a 1966 abstract painting by Frank Stella. It is currently in the collection of the San Francisco Museum of Modern Art.
